Rudolf Cvetko (November 17, 1880 – December 15, 1977) was a Slovene fencer who competed in the 1912 Summer Olympics in Stockholm, Sweden. He was the first Slovene to qualify for the Olympics and the first Slovene winner of the Olympic medal. He was part of the Austrian sabre team, which won the silver medal. In the individual foil event he was eliminated in the first round.

Cvetko was born in Senožeče to a Slovene gendarme Janez Cvetko. He studied in Ljubljana and in Trieste, and served in the Austro-Hungarian Army between 1900 and 1913, after which he worked as a physical education teacher in the Slovene-language high school in Gorizia. After WWI, he moved to the Kingdom of Serbs, Croats and Slovenes.

References

External links

Rudolf Cvetko Olympic medals and stats

1880 births
1977 deaths
Slovenian male foil fencers
Olympic fencers of Austria
Fencers at the 1912 Summer Olympics
Olympic silver medalists for Austria
Olympic medalists in fencing
Slovenian referees and umpires
Medalists at the 1912 Summer Olympics
Slovenian male sabre fencers